The following is a list of events affecting Canadian television in 1965. Events listed include television show debuts, finales, cancellations, and channel launches, closures and rebrandings.

Events

Debuts

Ending this year

Television shows

1950s
Country Canada (1954–2007)
CBC News Magazine (1952–1981)
Chez Hélène (1959–1973)
Circle 8 Ranch (1955–1978)
Don Messer's Jubilee (1957–1969)
The Friendly Giant (1958–1985)
Hockey Night in Canada (1952–present)
The National (1954–present)
Front Page Challenge (1957–1995)
Wayne and Shuster Show (1958–1989)

1960s
20/20 (1962-1967)
Butternut Square (1964-1967)
Canada 98 (1964-1967)
Cariboo Country (1960, 1964–1967)
CTV National News (1961–present)
Elwood Glover's Luncheon Date (1963–1975)
Flashbook (1962-1968)
Land and Sea (1964–present)
Let's Go (1964-1968)
Magistrate's Court (1963–1969)
Music Hop (1962–1972)
The Nature of Things (1960–present, scientific documentary series)
People in Conflict (1962–1970)
The Pierre Berton Show (1962-1973)
Razzle Dazzle (1961-1966)
Reach for the Top (1961–1985)
Singalong Jubilee (1961–1974)
Take 30 (1962–1983)
Telescope (1963–1973)
This Hour Has Seven Days (1964-1966)

TV movies

Television stations

Debuts

See also
 1965 in Canada
 List of Canadian films

References